Ismael Sousa Nurmamade (born 3 December 1991) is a Mozambican basketball player for Ferroviário da Beira and the Mozambique national basketball team.

Nurmamade has been a long-time member of Ferroviário da Beira, playing for the team since 2013. He was named the MVP of the Mozambican Basketball League in 2017. He made his debut in the Basketball Africa League (BAL) in the 2022 season.

Nurmamade has played with the Mozambique national team.

BAL career statistics

|-
| style="text-align:left;"|2022
| style="text-align:left;"|Ferroviário da Beira
| 5 || 1 || 20.3 || .435 || .278 || .143 || 2.0 || 2.0 || 1.6 || .0 || 9.2
|-
|- class="sortbottom"
| style="text-align:center;" colspan="2"|Career
| 5 || 1 || 20.3 || .435 || .278 || .143 || 2.0 || 2.0 || 1.6 || .0 || 9.2

References

External links

1991 births
Living people
Mozambican basketball players
Shooting guards
Clube Ferroviário da Beira basketball players